Newton Harris White (1860–1931) was an American farmer and politician. He was elected as a Democratic member of the Tennessee House of Representatives in 1899. He served as the Speaker of the Tennessee Senate from 1901 to 1903, and from 1913 to 1915. He is the father of Captain Newton Harris White, Jr., a 1907 graduate of the U.S. Naval Academy. Newton White, Jr. was an early naval aviator, the first commanding officer of the USS Enterprise in 1939, and owner of the Newton White Mansion in Mitchellville, Maryland.

References

1860 births
1931 deaths
People from Pulaski, Tennessee
Farmers from Tennessee
Democratic Party members of the Tennessee House of Representatives
Democratic Party Tennessee state senators